Magadan-13 Airport  is a small airport in Russia located 10 km northeast of Magadan.  It handles most propeller-driven transports. Regular passenger Ilyushin Il-14 aircraft were flying here in the 1950s and early 1960s.  In the 1970s and 1980s it was a busy airport for charter operations (Antonov An-2, Mi-4, Mi-8, etc.) which served geological expeditions, firefighters, and local transport routes.
This is probably a former PVO-Strany fighter field, based on the length of the now-unusable runway between the current active runway and the ramp area.

References
RussianAirFields.com

Airports built in the Soviet Union
Airports in Magadan Oblast
Magadan